Kakani Govardhan Reddy (born 10 November 1964) is an Indian Politician.Minister for Agriculture,Cooperation,Marketing,Food Processing in Government of Andhra Pradesh.Member of the Legislative Assembly (India) from Sarvepalli (Assembly constituency) of Andhra Pradesh Legislative Assembly. He won as an MLA for the second time from this constituency in 2019 Andhra Pradesh Legislative Assembly election being a Yuvajana Sramika Rythu Congress Party (YSR Congress Party) candidate. Earlier he was elected as an MLA from the same constituency in 2014 Andhra Pradesh Legislative Assembly election.

He started his political career as the Zilla Parishad Chairman of Sri Potti Sri Ramulu Nellore District in 2006. Later he joined Y. S. Jaganmohan Reddy's YSR Congress party in 2011. He is also working as YSR Congress Party's parliament district president for Nellore (Lok Sabha constituency).

References 

YSR Congress Party politicians
People from Nellore district
Andhra Pradesh MLAs 2019–2024
Andhra Pradesh MLAs 2014–2019
1964 births
Living people